Ottaviano Del Turco (born 7 November 1944) is an Italian politician.

Early life
Del Turco was born in Collelongo on 7 November 1944.

Career
After a career in trade unionism in the Italian General Confederation of Labour (CGIL), Del Turco rose to the top of Bettino Craxi's Italian Socialist Party (PSI) before it was swept away in the Tangentopoli scandals of 1992–94. Del Turco was the president of the Antimafia Commission from December 1996 to May 2000. He was Minister of Finance in the cabinet led by the then prime minister Giuliano Amato from 2000 to 2001.

He was elected to the European Parliament in 2004 on the Italian Democratic Socialists (SDI) ticket and sat with the Party of European Socialists group. On 20 July 2004, he was elected chair of the committee on employment and social affairs at the parliament.

On 4 April 2005 he won the election as president of his native Abruzzo as candidate for centre-left coalition The Union and on 1 May resigned his seat in the European Parliament to take up this post. In 2007, he founded the Reformist Alliance (Italian: Alleanza Riformista) movement within the SDI, with which he left the SDI and became a member of the Democratic Party (Partito Democratico, PD) at the PD's founding congress on 14 October 2007. He was a member of the 45-strong national council. On 16 July 2008, he resigned as President of Abruzzo and left the national council of the PD.

Controversy
On 14 July 2008, Del Turco was arrested on suspicion of involvement in a 12.8M euro fraud in the financing of the public health system of his region. He was not charged with a crime, but was suspected of corruption and criminal association, prosecutors said. He was among 10 people arrested or placed under house arrest.

Sentencing
Del Turco was sentenced to nine and a half years in prison for his involvement in the exchange of health sector bribes. He was convicted by a court in the city of Pescara on Monday 22 July 2013. The sentencing was in connection with a major 15-million-euro (US$19-million) fraud in the financing of the public health system. In addition to the jail term, he was ordered to pay more than 3 million euros in damages and given a lifetime ban on holding public office.

References

1944 births
Living people
Presidents of Abruzzo
Italian Democratic Socialists MEPs
MEPs for Italy 2004–2009
21st-century Italian politicians
People from the Province of L'Aquila
Italian Socialist Party politicians
Labour Federation (Italy) politicians
Democrats of the Left MEPs
Italian Socialists politicians
Finance ministers of Italy
Heads of government who were later imprisoned
Italian politicians convicted of crimes